Jason Ray Saine is a Republican member of the North Carolina House of Representatives, having represented the 97th district (based in Lincoln County) since his appointment in 2011. A public relations and social media manager from Lincolnton he was re-elected to the seat in 2012, 2014, 2016, 2018, and 2020.

Committee assignments

2021-2022
Appropriations (Senior Chair)
Appropriations - Information Technology
Energy and Public Utilities
Ethics
Judiciary I
Redistricting (Vice Chair)
Rules, Calendar, and Operations
Alcoholic Beverage Control

2019-2020
Appropriations (Senior Chair)
Appropriations - Information Technology
Energy and Public Utilities
Ethics
Redistricting 
Rules, Calendar, and Operations
Alcoholic Beverage Control

2017-2018
Appropriations (Vice Chair)
Appropriations - Information Technology
Rules, Calendar, and Operations
Finance (Chair)
Education (K-12)
Alcoholic Beverage Control

2015-2016
Appropriations (Vice Chair)
Appropriations - Information Technology (Chair)
Rules, Calendar, and Operations
Finance (Senior Chair)
Elections
Health
Judiciary II
Commerce and Job Development
Alcoholic Beverage Control

2013-2014
Appropriations (Vice Chair)
Rules, Calendar, and Operations
Education
Elections
Judiciary 
Transportation
Commerce and Job Development (Vice Chair)
Alcoholic Beverage Control

Electoral history

2020

2018

2016

2014

2012

References

External links
 Campaign Website

Year of birth missing (living people)
Living people
University of North Carolina at Charlotte alumni
Columbia Southern University alumni
Republican Party members of the North Carolina House of Representatives
21st-century American politicians
People from Lincolnton, North Carolina